Tatisilwai railway station, station code TIS, is the railway station serving the capital city of Ranchi in the Ranchi district in the Indian state of Jharkhand. Tatisilwai station belongs to the Ranchi division of the South Eastern Railway zone of the Indian Railways.

Ranchi has trains running frequently to Delhi and Kolkata. Many important trains start from Ranchi Junction as well.

Facilities 
The major facilities available are waiting rooms, reservation counter, vehicle parking etc. The vehicles are allowed to enter the station premises. There is no tea stall, book stall, post or telegraphic office. Security personnel from the Government Railway Police (G.R.P.) and  Railway Protection Force (RPF) are present for security.

Platforms 
There are four platforms which are interconnected with foot overbridge (FOB).

Nearest airports 
The nearest airports to Tatisilwai station are:

Birsa Munda Airport, Ranchi  
Gaya Airport, Gaya 
Lok Nayak Jayaprakash Airport, Patna 
Netaji Subhash Chandra Bose International Airport, Kolkata

References

External links 

 Tatisilwai station map
 Official website of the Ranchi district

Railway stations in Ranchi district
Transport in Ranchi
Buildings and structures in Ranchi
Ranchi railway division